Hamilton House may refer to:

Hamilton House (Providence, Rhode Island), a non-profit organization

Places

Scotland
Hamilton House, East Lothian, a manor in East Lothian, Scotland

United States

California 
Thomas Hamilton House (San Diego, California), a San Diego historic landmark
Capt. James A. Hamilton House, San Jose, California, listed on the NRHP in Santa Clara County, California

Georgia 
Dr. James S. Hamilton House, Athens, Georgia, listed on the NRHP in Clarke County, Georgia

Illinois 
John M. Hamilton House, Bloomington, Illinois, NRHP-listed
Robert W. Hamilton House, Murphysboro, Illinois, listed on the NRHP in Jackson County, Illinois

Indiana 
John Hamilton House, Shelbyville, Indiana, listed on the NRHP in Shelby County, Indiana

Kentucky 
Hance Hamilton House, Boston, Kentucky, listed on the NRHP in Hardin County, Kentucky
Hamilton House (Lancaster, Kentucky), listed on the NRHP in Garrard County, Kentucky
Roscoe Hamilton House, Lancaster, Kentucky, listed on the NRHP in Garrard County, Kentucky
Thomas H. Hamilton House, Springfield, Kentucky, listed on the NRHP in Washington County, Kentucky
Hamilton Farm, Springfield, Kentucky, listed on the NRHP in Washington County, Kentucky

Maine 
Thomas Hamilton House (Calais, Maine), listed on the NRHP in Washington County, Maine
Hamilton House (South Berwick, Maine) or the Jonathan Hamilton House, NRHP-listed and a National Historic Landmark, in York County

Maryland 
Hamilton House, in Bethesda, Maryland, now the Stone Ridge School of the Sacred Heart
James Hamilton House, Mitchellville, Maryland, NRHP-listed

Massachusetts 
Hamilton Mill Brick House, Southbridge, Massachusetts, NRHP-listed

Michigan 
George Hamilton House, Stambaugh, Michigan, listed on the NRHP in Iron County, Michigan

Missouri 
Hamilton House (Bethany, Missouri), listed on the NRHP in Harrison County, Missouri

Nebraska 
William Hamilton House, Bellevue, Nebraska, listed on the NRHP in Sarpy County, Nebraska
Hamilton-Donald House, Grand Island, Nebraska, listed on the NRHP in Hall County, Nebraska

New York 
Hamilton Farmstead, Mexico, New York, NRHP-listed
Hamilton Park Community Houses, New York, New York, listed on the NRHP in Richmond County, New York

Ohio 
Hamilton-Ickes House, Adena, Ohio, listed on the NRHP in Jefferson County, Ohio
J.L. Hamilton Residence, Amlin, Ohio, listed on the NRHP in Franklin County, Ohio
Gilbert H. Hamilton House, Columbus, Ohio, listed on the NRHP in Columbus, Ohio

Oregon 
Benjamin Hamilton House, Bend, Oregon, listed on the NRHP in Deschutes County, Oregon
Alexander B. and Anna Balch Hamilton House, Portland, Oregon, listed on the NRHP in northwest Portland, Oregon
Judge James Watson Hamilton House, Roseburg, Oregon, listed on the NRHP in Douglas County, Oregon

Pennsylvania 
Hamilton Family Estate, Philadelphia, Pennsylvania, listed on the NRHP in West Philadelphia, Pennsylvania
Alexander Hamilton House, Waynesboro, Pennsylvania, NRHP-listed
Hamilton-Ely Farmstead, Whitely Township, Pennsylvania, listed on the NRHP in Greene County, Pennsylvania

Tennessee 
Hamilton-Brown House, Franklin, Tennessee, listed on the NRHP in Williamson County, Tennessee

Texas 
Joseph Andrew Hamilton House, Wharton, Texas, listed on the NRHP in Wharton County, Texas
William Benjamin Hamilton House, Wichita Falls, Texas, listed on the NRHP in Wichita County, Texas

Vermont 
John Hamilton Farmstead, Bridport, Vermont, listed on the NRHP in Addison County, Vermont

West Virginia 
Hamilton Round Barn, Mannington, West Virginia, listed on the NRHP in Marion County, West Virginia
Martin Hamilton House, Summersville, West Virginia, listed on the NRHP in Nicholas County, West Virginia

Wisconsin 
Hamilton-Brooks Site, Berlin, Wisconsin, listed on the NRHP in Green Lake County, Wisconsin

See also
Thomas Hamilton House (disambiguation)
Hamilton Hall (disambiguation)